The Gulliver River is a river in the Fiordland area of New Zealand. It starts in the Darran Mountains near the Grave-Talbot Pass, and flows north and then west into the Cleddau River, which runs into Milford Sound. The river was named in 1906 by W.G. Grave for Alf Grenfell, who had a nickname of "Gulliver".

In 1975 three remaining kakapo in the Esperance and Gulliver Valleys were moved to Maud Island.

Esperance River 
The Esperance River is a  tributary flowing from the west off Mount Isolation. Large rimu and beech trees line the river up to about the  contour.

See also
List of rivers of New Zealand

References

Land Information New Zealand - Search for Place Names

Rivers of Fiordland